The 2011 Dudley Metropolitan Borough Council election was held on 5 May 2011 to elect members of Dudley Metropolitan Borough Council in the West Midlands, England, as part of the 2011 United Kingdom local elections. 24 seats were up for election, and the results saw the Conservatives hold on to a slightly reduced majority of 15.

2011 English local elections
2011
2010s in the West Midlands (county)